Khristos Garefis (born 7 April 1955) is a Greek sailor. He competed in the Tornado event at the 2004 Summer Olympics.

References

External links
 

1955 births
Living people
Greek male sailors (sport)
Olympic sailors of Greece
Sailors at the 2004 Summer Olympics – Tornado
Place of birth missing (living people)